Laudetia is a genus of spiders in the family Liocranidae. It was first described in 1941 by Gertsch. , it contains 3 species from the Caribbean.

References

Liocranidae
Araneomorphae genera
Spiders of the Caribbean